Beyond the Sixth Seal is a side-project band of Mike McKenzie and Greg Weeks of The Red Chord. They were formed as a thrash metal band in the suburbs of Boston in 1998 and released a few demos. In the summer of 2000, bassist Adam Wentworth (The Red Chord) joined up with BTSS to record their debut EP A Homicide Divine in early 2001.

After a European tour and a series of shows in the United States, writing for the full length began. Earth And Sphere was written during a major line-up change, as Adam moved to guitar and the band saw the exit of Rob Devlin (guitar) and Lawrence Kwong (vocals). Beyond the Sixth Seal continued the album writing process while searching for suitable replacements. The first to join was Matt Woods (American Nightmare) on bass, followed shortly after by Mike McKenzie (also of The Red Chord) on vocals. The album was released in 2002 on German label Lifeforce Records and Beyond the Sixth Seal disbanded the following year in 2003.

In 2006, the band has reformed as a studio project and is currently signed to Metal Blade Records. A rough demo of a new song appears on their Myspace page.

Members
Brendan Roche - drums (1998-2003, 2006–)
Mike "Gunface" McKenzie - vocals, guitar (2001-2003, 2006-)
Greg Weeks - bass (2003, 2006-)

Former members
 Ross McCue - guitar
Justin Chapel - guitar (1998-2003)
Rob Devlin - guitar (1998-2001)
 Lawrence Kwong - vocals (1998-2001)
Adam Wentworth - bass (2000-2001) guitar (2001-2003)
 Matt Woods - bass (2001-2003)

Discography
Albums
2002: Earth and Sphere (Lifeforce Records)
2007: The Resurrection of Everything Tough (Metal Blade Records)

EPs
2001: A Homicide Divine (Voice of Life Records)

Demos
1999: Genocide Empire
2000: The White Demo
2002: Knives & Guns

References

External links
 
 [ Beyond the Sixth Seal] at AllMusic
 Lifeforce Records

Heavy metal musical groups from Massachusetts
American melodic death metal musical groups
Musical groups established in 1998
Musical groups disestablished in 2003
Musical groups reestablished in 2006
Black Market Activities artists
Metal Blade Records artists
American musical trios
1998 establishments in Massachusetts